Kurt Weber (24 May 1928 – 4 June 2015) was a Polish cinematographer known for working on comedic and dramatic filmse from the 1950s to the 1980s, primarily in Poland and West Germany.

He was born in Poland to Jewish family as a son of Edward Weber (1897–1961), the last President of the Jewish Community in Cieszyn.

Filmography
 1959: Baza Ludzi Umarlych	(The Depot of the Dead)
 1961: Ludzie Z Pociagu (Panic on the Train)	 	
 1962: Zaduszki (All Soul's Day)  
 1966: Salto (Somersault (U.S. title); also translated as The Dance)	 
 1976: Schneeglöckchen blühen im September (Snowdrops Bloom in September)	 	
 1976: Hauptlehrer Hofer (Schoolmaster Hofer)	
 1978: Winterspelt	 	
 1981: Der Mond ist nur a nackerte Kugel (The Moon's Only A Naked Ball)

References

External links

1928 births
2015 deaths
Polish cinematographers
20th-century Polish Jews